The 1931 Santa Clara Broncos football team was an American football team that represented Santa Clara University as an independent during the 1931 college football season. In their third season under head coach Maurice J. "Clipper" Smith, the Broncos compiled a 5–4–1 record and outscored opponents by a total of 94 to 53.

Schedule

References

Santa Clara
Santa Clara Broncos football seasons
Santa Clara Broncos football